Strong Enough is the second studio album by American country music band Blackhawk, released in 1995. It features the singles "I'm Not Strong Enough to Say No", "Like There Ain't No Yesterday", "Almost a Memory Now", "Big Guitar", and "King of the World", which respectively reached numbers 2, 3, 11, 17, and 49 on the Hot Country Songs charts. The album itself earned RIAA gold certification for sales of 500,000 copies.

The track "Cast Iron Heart" was previously recorded by Pearl River on their 1993 album Find Out What's Happening, and would later be recorded by Linda Davis on her 1996 album Some Things Are Meant to Be. In addition, "Bad Love Gone Good" was previously recorded by John Anderson on 1993's Solid Ground.

Track listing

Chart performance

Weekly charts

Year-end charts

Singles

Personnel
Compiled from liner notes.

Blackhawk
Henry Paul – lead vocals, acoustic guitar
Dave Robbins – keyboard, baritone vocals
Van Stephenson – tenor vocals

Additional musicians
Mike Chapman - bass guitar
Bobby Huff - drums
Dann Huff - electric guitar
Kenny Malone - percussion
Carl Marsh - programming
Dale Oliver - electric guitar
Danny Parks - additional electric guitar
Kip Raines - additional drums
Eric Silver - mandolin
Joe Spivey - fiddle
Biff Watson - acoustic guitar
Lonnie Wilson - drums

Technical
Mark Bright - production
Mike Clute - associate production, recording, mixing
Tim DuBois - executive production
Hank Williams - mastering

References

1995 albums
Arista Records albums
Blackhawk (band) albums
Albums produced by Mark Bright (record producer)